Cechetra minor, the lesser green hawkmoth, is a moth of the family Sphingidae.

Distribution 
It is known from northern India, Nepal, Thailand, eastern and southern China, Taiwan, southern Japan and Vietnam.

Description 
The wingspan is 90–98 mm. The upperside of the thorax is lacking a pale medial band. There are seven postmedian lines on the forewing upperside and seven lines on the distal half of the wing. The forewing underside ground colour is orange-beige.

Biology 
The larvae have been recorded feeding on Saurauia pundiana, Vitis and Amorphophallus species in India and Cayratia japonica in China.

References

Moths described in 1875